The BMW K1600GT, K1600GTL, and K1600B are motorcycles manufactured by BMW Motorrad. The former two were announced in July 2010,
unveiled at the Intermot motorcycle show in Cologne in October 2010; they went on sale in March 2011. The latter was announced in October 2016.
The K1600GTL is a full dress luxury tourer, which replaced the K1200LT. It was intended to compete with the Honda Gold Wing. The K1600GT was more of a sport tourer similar to the then-existing K1300GT and previous K1200GT models. The K1600B is a bagger designed primarily for the North American market.

Technology

The bikes feature a new  straight-six engine which is mounted transversely across chassis. The cylinders are angled forward by 55°.
The engine was originally used on the Concept 6, a concept bike that was shown at the 2009 EICMA Milan Motor Show.
The engine has electronic throttle control and multiple drive modes which can be set according to road conditions.

New technology for BMW on these models include adaptive headlights. As standard the headlights shine onto a mirror which keeps the beam level according to how the bike is pitched. The optional adaptive headlights include a servomotor that directs the headlight beam according to how the bike is leaning in a turn, effectively pointing the beam around the bend.

To save weight, the motorcycle has a unique cast magnesium alloy subframe to which the front fairing is secured.

2022 model year redesign
The K1600 was redesigned for the 2022 model year to include an all-digital instrument cluster with  color display. Navigation is integrated with the same display.

Reception
In July 2011, US magazine Cycle World named the K1600GT as its best sport touring motorcycle, and the K1600GTL as the best touring motorcycle for 2011. 
Motorcyclist named the K1600GT as Best Touring Bike in its 2011 Motorcycle of the Year awards. 
UK weekly newspaper Motor Cycle News named the K1600GT as Best Tourer at its MCN Awards 2011.

Motorcyclist road tested the K1600GTL against the Honda Gold Wing and preferred the Honda. They did note that the additions on the K1600GTL over the K1600GT worked against it, and concluded that the latter was the better bike.

See also
List of motorcycles by type of engine

Footnotes

References

External links

K1600GT  at BMW Motorrad international website
K1600GTL at BMW Motorrad international website

K1600
Six-cylinder motorcycles
Shaft drive motorcycles
Touring motorcycles
Motorcycles introduced in 2011